Chastain Peak is a peak,  high, near the center of the Moulton Escarpment, at the western margin of the Thiel Mountains. It was surveyed by the United States Geological Survey Thiel Mountains party, 1960–61, and named by the Advisory Committee on Antarctic Names after William W. Chastain, Aviation Structural Mechanic, U.S. Navy, who lost his life in the crash of a P2V Neptune aircraft soon after takeoff from Wilkes Station, November 9, 1961.

See also
 Mountains in Antarctica

References
 

Mountains of Ellsworth Land